Aloysius "Älu" Eduardo Mendonca (5 January 1933 – 10 March 2017) was an Indian-born Kenyan field hockey player. He competed at the 1956, 1960, 1964 and the 1968 Summer Olympics.

References

External links
 

1933 births
2017 deaths
Kenyan male field hockey players
Olympic field hockey players of Kenya
Field hockey players at the 1956 Summer Olympics
Field hockey players at the 1960 Summer Olympics
Field hockey players at the 1964 Summer Olympics
Field hockey players at the 1968 Summer Olympics
People from North Goa district
Field hockey players from Goa
Indian emigrants to Kenya
Sportspeople from Nairobi
Kenyan people of Indian descent
Kenyan people of Goan descent